Mimosa is a 1999 compilation album released by Fun Lovin' Criminals. The album is a collection of rarities, B-sides, remixes, and covers. It features some notable lounge music versions of old FLC songs, with the exception of "Bombin the L" (c. 1956 Version) which, as the title suggests, is performed in a fast swing style. "I'm Not in Love" was a successful double A-side single with "Scooby Snacks", but it was not released on an album until Mimosa. It was however included in the 1997 compilation Lounge-A-Palooza. Ian McCulloch sings vocals on "Summer Wind".

Track listing 
All tracks composed by Fun Lovin' Criminals; except where indicated.
 "Couldn't Get It Right" (Climax Blues Band cover) - 3:46 
 "Scooby Snacks" (Schmoove Version) - 3:21
 "Shining Star" (Leo Graham, Paul Richmond) - 4:43
 "Bombin' the L" (c. 1956 Version) - 2:27
 "I'm Not in Love" (10cc cover) - 4:36
 "Summer Wind" (with Ian McCulloch) - 2:43
 "Crazy Train" (Ozzy Osbourne cover) - 3:29
 "I Can't Get with That" (Schmoove Version) - 5:33
 "We Have All the Time in the World" (Copa Cabana Version) (John Barry, Hal David) - 2:44
 "Coney Island Girl" (Schmoove Version) - 3:07
 "I'll Be Seeing You" (Sammy Fain, Irving Kahal) - 5:51 *(Hidden track @ 1:30 - "Up on the Hill" (Schmoove Instrumental))

Fun Lovin' Criminals albums
1999 compilation albums
EMI Records compilation albums